Capanema, Pará is a municipality in the state of Pará in the Northern region of Brazil.

 'Capanema' is a municipality in the state of Pará. It is located at a latitude 01 ° 11'45 "South and longitude 47 ° 10'51" west, with an altitude of 24 meters. Its population in 2020 was 69,431 inhabitants.
Despite being a city average, requires great influence in the region in trade and services. A receptive and lively city, where it became home to many immigrants from various regions of Brazil, mainly from Northeast.

History 
The origin of the name Capanema occurred during the construction of telegraph constructed by engineer William Schuch, the Barão de Capanema, the mining village of Antonio Pereira, Ouro Preto, born January 17, 1824, son Austrians. He studied engineering at the Polytechnic School of Vienna and returned to Brazil with all the credentials that allowed him to modern scientific training. Under the auspices of the emperor, on May 11, 1852, he founded the National telegraph, which was the first and only director. Capanema The river's name was also given in his honor, as was the river that William Schuch and his team stopped to rest in between work.

Geography 
Capanema is distant 160 km from Belém on the highway (BR 316). It is the city's most developed region Bragantina in northeastern in state of Pará. Here is manufactured cement Nassau, the first and largest cement plant in the state. Capanema is the city that has better bragantina region's economic development, it can be proved by per capita GDP that is above the regional average. But there are still major problems in local infrastructure, such as paving roads, sewage and water supply.

Industry 
The industry Capanema is not yet consolidated. However has a remarkable average structure.
One of these is the producer of Cement Cibrasa Nassau, a large manufacturing company located in the municipality of Capanema.

Colleges 
 Universidade Federal do Pará;
 Faculdade Pan Americana;
 Fatec;
 Unama.

See also
List of municipalities in Pará
Listagem de Empresas e Serviços de Capanema - Tudo Aqui

References

Municipalities in Pará